This is a list of notable cases of law enforcement brutality, including Police brutality(Urdu: پولیس گردی) in Pakistan.

1960 – Communist leader Hassan Nasir was killed during interrogation in Lahore Fort.
1980 – Communist leader Nazeer Abbasi was one of many who died under interrogation during the martial law of Muhammad Zia-ul-Haq.
2010 – In Abbottabad police killings incident during protest against a constitutional amendment several protesters were shot dead and dozens were injured by Khyber Pakhtunkhwa Police.
2011 – In the Kharotabad Incident, five Russian and Tajik citizens were shot dead by Frontier Corps and police after falsely being reported as suicide bombers when approaching a border checkpoint. Dr. Baqir Shah, a police surgeon who testified against the official story, was attacked at a restaurant in Quetta, and later shot dead by unknown gunmen.
2014 – In Model Town incident during an encroachment operation Punjab Police opened firing at civilians clashing with police at Lahore killing more than a dozen and injuring hundreds.
2015 – Two young brothers, Zeshan and Shakeel, were killed in police firing near Holy Family Hospital in Rawalpindi. Sources said Zeshan and Shakeel were returning home from work when police signaled them to stop at a checkpoint. Upon refusal, they were shot several times. One of them died instantly while other brother succumbed to injuries upon reaching the hospital. Both victims were unarmed.
2018 – In a fake encounter by Karachi Police SSP Rao Anwar, a civilian Naqeebullah Mehsud was killed.
2019 – A family was killed by Punjab Counter Terrorism Department(CTD) during an alleged terrorism encounter in Sahiwal incident.
2021 – 22 year old university student, Usama Nadeem, was shot multiple times by police after negating orders to stop. As per reports, the youth was reaching back home when he was shot dead on Islamabad’s Srinagar Highway last week, after he negated police's warnings to stop. The young man's father, in a complaint to police, stated: "My son was shot multiple times. The anti-terror squad openly committed terrorism by aiming at the windscreen instead of the tires,"

References

Pakistan
Brutality
Police Brutality
Police Brutality
Law enforcement in Pakistan
Law enforcement-related lists